The 2021 Diamond Head Classic was a mid-season eight-team college basketball tournament that was played on December 22, 23, and 25 at the Stan Sheriff Center in Honolulu, Hawaii. It was the 12th annual Diamond Head Classic tournament, and was part of the 2021–22 NCAA Division I men's basketball season. The 2021 field was announced in May, and featured BYU, Hawai’i, Liberty, Northern Iowa, South Florida, Stanford, Vanderbilt and Wyoming.

The championship final between Stanford and Vanderbilt was canceled because of COVID-19 issues in the Cardinal camp.

Bracket
* – Denotes overtime period

Notes:
All games played at the Stan Sheriff Center in Honolulu, Hawaii.    * Northern Iowa vs Hawai’i was canceled due to Covid issues.  * Stanford vs Vanderbilt was canceled due to Covid issues.

References

Diamond Head Classic
Diamond Head Classic
Diamond Head Classic
Diamond Head Classic